P.C. Cobb Stadium (previously Dal-Hi Stadium) was an outdoor athletic stadium near downtown Dallas, Texas. The 22,000 seat stadium, named in honor of the former Dallas Independent School District athletic director and coach, was built of reinforced concrete under the Works Progress Administration program in 1939 and was used for high school sporting events of the Dallas Independent School District. In 1969 it was the home of the Dallas Tornado, a professional soccer team in the now-defunct North American Soccer League. The  site and stadium was sold and demolished to make way for the Dallas Infomart, built in 1985.

A planned trail dubbed "The Connection" that joins the Katy Trail to the Trinity Strand Trail will run through the former site of the stadium and incorporate material from the demolished structure into its retaining walls. Originally preserved by Infomart developer Trammell Crow, the material was later turned over to the city's Department of Parks and Recreation for storage.

References 

p
Buildings and structures in Dallas
Sports venues demolished in 1981
Defunct soccer venues in the United States
Demolished sports venues in Texas
Works Progress Administration in Texas
North American Soccer League (1968–1984) stadiums
American football venues in the Dallas–Fort Worth metroplex
Soccer venues in Texas
High school football venues in Texas
1981 disestablishments in Texas
1939 establishments in Texas
Sports venues completed in 1939